The Chhapra–Mathura Superfast Express is a Superfast Express train belonging to North Eastern Railway zone that runs between  and  in India. It is currently being operated with 22531/22532 train numbers on a tri-weekly basis.

Service

The 22531/Chhapra–Mathura Superfast Express has an average speed of 53 km/hr and covers 881 km in 16h 40m. The 22532/Mathura–Chhapra Superfast Express has an average speed of 50 km/hr and covers 881 km in 17h 40m.

Route and halts 

The important halts of the train are:

Coach composition

The train has standard ICF rakes with a max speed of 110 kmph. The train consists of 17 coaches:

 2 AC III Tier
 7 Sleeper coaches
 6 General Unreserved
 2 Seating cum Luggage Rake

Traction

Currently this train is being hauled with Gonda-based WAP-4 locomotive from Chhapra Junction till Mathura and vice versa.

See also 

 Chhapra Junction railway station
 Mathura Junction railway station

Notes

References

External links 

 15107/Chhapra–Mathura Express India Rail Info
 15108/Mathura–Chhapra Express India Rail Info

Transport in Chhapra
Transport in Mathura
Express trains in India
Rail transport in Uttar Pradesh
Rail transport in Bihar
Railway services introduced in 2015